Carallia calycina is a species of plant in the family Rhizophoraceae endemic to Sri Lanka.

References

calycina
Flora of Sri Lanka
Vulnerable plants
Taxonomy articles created by Polbot